Çetin Güngör (born 7 June 1990) is a Turkish footballer who plays as a defender for Eyüpspor.

Club career

Galatasaray S.K.
Çetin Güngör rose through the ranks of the Galatasaray youth and academy team, and was promoted to Galatasaray S.K. first team during the 2009–10 season.

Kartalspor
In the summer of 2010 he signed for Turkish Second League side Şanlıurfaspor on loan.

Gaziantepspor
On 27 June 2011, he signed a four-year contract with Gaziantepspor on free transfer.

Çaykur Rizespor
After struggling to become the first team at Gaziantepspor for the 2011-12 season, he moved to Çaykur Rizespor on a two-year contract in August 2012.

Career statistics

Club

References

External links
 
 

1990 births
Living people
Footballers from Istanbul
Turkish footballers
Turkey youth international footballers
Galatasaray A2 footballers
Galatasaray S.K. footballers
Gaziantepspor footballers
Çaykur Rizespor footballers
Süper Lig players
Association football defenders